T45 is a Swedish diesel-electric locomotive operated by Swedish State Railways and later other companies. It was in passenger service with SJ from 1971 to 1976, after which it was used in heavy industry. It is the only diesel locomotive to be built by Allmänna Svenska Elektriska Aktiebolaget (ASEA).

The loco used a SEMT Pielstick diesel engine. ASEA used the same bogies and electrical systems as on the Rc locomotive, while Thune of Norway built the mechanical parts.

History
ASEA had been dominating the Swedish market for electric locomotives, but Nykvist & Holm had been dominating the diesel segment. In the late 1960s ASEA decided to enter the diesel market, and in 1969 SJ ordered five units, with delivery in 1971-72. They were dispatched in Borlänge. In 1976 SJ returned them back to ASEA due to them not being reliable enough and that SJ didn't want another diesel engine class. ASEA tried to sell the locos abroad, but only one was sold to Norway. The remaining were sold to industrial companies in Sweden, including the iron mills in Avesta and Hofors.

References

External links
 Järnväg.net on T45

ASEA locomotives
Thune locomotives
T45
Bo′Bo′ locomotives
Railway locomotives introduced in 1971
Standard gauge locomotives of Norway